

Season summary
Manager Ottmar Hitzfeld was promoted to sporting director, and Nevio Scala was appointed as his replacement. Under Scala, Dortmund made a strong showing in the Champions League: although they failed to defend the title, there was no shame in their semi-final defeat to eventual winners Real Madrid. Of more concern was their league form, coming 10th (their lowest finish since 1991). This prompted his departure; replacing him was his assistant Michael Skibbe, making him (until 2016) the youngest Bundesliga head coach of all time.

Kit

First-team squad
Squad at end of season

Left club during season

Competitions

DFB-Ligapokal

Preliminary round

Semi-finals

Bundesliga

League table

UEFA Super Cup

Intercontinental Cup

Final

Champions League

Group stage

Quarter-finals

Semi-finals

Statistics

Transfers

References

Borussia Dortmund seasons
Borussia Dortmund